The South Patagonian Batholith is group of plutons in southwestern Patagonia. The rocks of batholith include granite, leucogranite, tonalite, granodiorite, diorite, gabbro and mafic dykes. The earliest plutons of the batholith formed in the Late Jurassic with the magmas likely being derived from anatexis. This early magmatism produced a bimodal magmatism that formed both leucogranite and gabbro.

References

Batholiths of South America
Lithodemic units of Argentina
Lithodemic units of Chile
Geology of Aysén Region
Geology of Magallanes Region
Jurassic magmatism